Robbie Weingard (born May 15, 1963) is an American former basketball player known for his college career at Hofstra University. Between 1981 and 1985, Weingard played point guard for the Hofstra Pride. He set still-standing program records for assists in a game (16) and season (228). As a senior in 1984–85, Weingard averaged an NCAA Division I-leading 9.50 assists per game, en route to becoming only the fourth officially recognized NCAA assists leader at that point. 

After graduating, Weingard played for Team USA in the 1985 Maccabiah Games, helping them to win a gold medal. He never played professionally.

See also
 List of NCAA Division I men's basketball season assists leaders

Further reading

References

1963 births
Living people
Maccabiah Games medalists in basketball
Maccabiah Games gold medalists for the United States
Basketball players from New York City
Hofstra Pride men's basketball players
Jewish men's basketball players
Point guards
Sportspeople from Brooklyn
Competitors at the 1985 Maccabiah Games
American men's basketball players
21st-century American Jews